Kalanchoideae is one of three subfamilies in the Saxifragales family Crassulaceae, with four succulent genera.

Genera 
The following five genera are recognised:

 Adromischus
 Cotyledon
 Kalanchoe
 Tylecodon

Taxonomy

References

External links
Kalanchoideae on species.wikimedia.org

Crassulaceae
Succulent plants
Plant subfamilies